Dwight Kiefert (born September 1, 1960) is an American politician. He has served as a Republican member for the 24th district in the North Dakota House of Representatives  since 2013.

References

1960 births
Living people
People from Barnes County, North Dakota
Businesspeople from North Dakota
Republican Party members of the North Dakota House of Representatives
21st-century American politicians